Crimora papillata is a species of sea slug, a nudibranch, a shell-less marine gastropod mollusc in the family Polyceridae.

Distribution 
This species was described from Moulin Huet Bay, Guernsey, Channel Isles, English Channel. It is found from Western Scotland to Portugal and in Morocco and the Mediterranean Sea.

References

External links
 

Polyceridae
Gastropods described in 1862